James Wilfred (Bill) Estey (December 1, 1889 – January 22, 1956) was a Canadian lawyer, politician, and jurist.

Born in Keswick Ridge, New Brunswick, the son of Byron Leslie Estey and Sarah Ann Kee, he received a Bachelor of Arts from the University of New Brunswick in 1910. In 1915, he received a Bachelor of Law from Harvard University in 1915. On 1917, he was called to the Saskatchewan bar, eventually founding the law firm Estey, Moxon, Schmitt & McDonald. He practised law as a Crown Prosecutor until 1929 in Saskatoon. He also taught law and economics at the University of Saskatchewan.

In 1934, he was elected to the Legislative Assembly of Saskatchewan as a Liberal. From 1934 to 1941, he was the Minister of Education. From 1939 to 1944, he was the Attorney General.

He was appointed to the Supreme Court of Canada on October 6, 1944, and served until his death in 1956. He was the second Saskatchewan judge of the Supreme Court (the first was John Henderson Lamont) and succeeded Sir Lyman Poore Duff as a western representative on the Court.

He is the father of Willard Estey, also a justice of the Supreme Court of Canada. He was a Baptist and a teetotaller.

References

External links
 Supreme Court of Canada biography

Justices of the Supreme Court of Canada
Harvard Law School alumni
1889 births
1956 deaths
Canadian Baptists
Saskatchewan Liberal Party MLAs
Attorneys-General of Saskatchewan
People from York County, New Brunswick
20th-century Baptists